Mircea Luca (3 August 1921 – 29 July 2008) was a Romanian football defender, manager and president at Universitatea Cluj.

Career
Mircea Luca was "U" Cluj's captain in the hardest period of the club's history. In 1940, the team moved from Cluj to Sibiu as a result of the Second Vienna Award, when the northern part of Transylvania was ceded to Hungary. In 1945, after the end of the Second World War and the return of the northern part of Transylvania to Romania, "U" returned to its home in Cluj. He also worked as an ENT surgeon. In 1994 Mircea Luca received the Honorary Citizen of Cluj-Napoca title. On 1 December 2013 a bronze statue of him was revealed to the public in front of the Cluj Arena stadium and in front of the statue was placed a marble plaque that says: "Dr. Mircea Luca 1921–2008. Fidelity, honor, respect, tradition".

Honours
Universitatea Cluj
Divizia B: 1950
Cupa României Runner-up: 1941–42, 1948–49

References

External links
Mircea Luca player profile at Labtof.ro
Mircea Luca manager profile at Labtof.ro

1921 births
2008 deaths
Romanian footballers
Association football defenders
Liga I players
Liga II players
FC Universitatea Cluj players
Romanian football managers
FC Universitatea Cluj managers
Romanian surgeons
Romanian sports executives and administrators
People from Zalău
20th-century surgeons